Agnes Yewande Savage (21 February 1906 – 7 September 1964) was a Nigerian medical doctor and the first West African woman to train and qualify in orthodox medicine. Savage was the first West African woman to receive a university degree in medicine, graduating with first-class honours from the University of Edinburgh in 1929 at the age of 23. In 1933, Sierra Leonean political activist and higher education pioneer, Edna Elliott-Horton became the second West African woman university graduate and the first to earn a bachelor's degree in the liberal arts.

Life

Early life and education 
Savage was born on 21 February 1906 in Edinburgh, Scotland, to Richard Akinwande Savage Sr, a Nigerian medical doctor, newspaper publisher and a 1900 Edinburgh graduate of Sierra Leone Creole descent and Maggie S. Bowie, a working-class Scotswoman. Her brother was Richard Gabriel Akinwande Savage, also a doctor who graduated from Edinburgh in 1926. Savage passed exams to the Royal College of Music in 1919 and was given a scholarship to study at George Watson's Ladies College. There, she received an award for General Proficiency in Class Work and passed the Scottish Higher Education Leaving Certificate.

She entered Edinburgh University to study medicine, excelled in her studies.  In her fourth year of medical school, she obtained first class honours in all subjects, won a prize in Diseases of the Skin and a medal in Forensic Medicine – becoming the first woman in the history of Edinburgh to do so. She was awarded the Dorothy Gilfillan Memorial Prize as the best woman graduate in 1929.

Medical career and legacy 
Savage faced gender and racial institutional barriers in her career. After graduation, she joined the colonial service in the Gold Coast (present-day Ghana) as a Junior Medical Officer. Though better qualified than most of her male counterparts, she received fewer benefits.

In 1931, she was recruited by the headmaster of Achimota College. At the urging of the headmaster, Alec Garden Fraser, the colonial government gave her a better contract. She was with Achimota for four years as a medical officer and a teacher. While at Achimota, she came into contact with Susan de Graft-Johnson when the latter was the Girls' School Prefect. Johnson regularly worked with Savage at the sick bay and later went on to also study medicine at the University of Edinburgh, becoming Ghana's first female medical doctor. Another West African woman medical pioneer who studied at both Achimota and Edinburgh was Matilda J. Clerk, who became the first Ghanaian woman to win a university merit scholarship, the second female doctor in Ghana and the fourth West African woman to train as a physician.

After Achimota, Savage went back to the colonial medical service and was given a better concession, in charge of the infant welfare clinics, associated with Korle Bu Hospital in Accra. Concurrently, she was appointed the assistant medical officer to the maternity department of the hospital and warden of the nurses' hostel. At Korle-Bu, she supervised the establishment of a training school for nurses, Korle-Bu Nurses Training College, where a ward was named in her honour.

Death 
Savage retired relatively early due to "physical and psychological exhaustion" in 1947 and spent the remainder of her life in Scotland raising her niece and nephew. She died of a stroke in 1964.

See also
 Timeline of women in science
 Women in medicine

References

1906 births
1964 deaths
20th-century Nigerian medical doctors
20th-century Nigerian women
20th-century women physicians
Alumni of the Royal College of Music
Alumni of the University of Edinburgh
Black British history
Black British people in health professions
British expatriates in Ghana
Gold Coast (British colony) people
Nigerian expatriates in Ghana
Nigerian people of Scottish descent
Nigerian women medical doctors
History of women in Nigeria
Medical doctors from Edinburgh
Agnes
Scottish people of Nigerian descent
Scottish people of Sierra Leonean descent
Sierra Leone Creole people
Saro people
Scottish people of Yoruba descent
University and college founders
Alumni of the University of Edinburgh Medical School
Yoruba women physicians